UkrAhroKom together with "Hermes-Treidynh" is a Ukrainian group of agriculture companies. It is headquartered in Oleksandriia Raion, Kirovohrad Oblast. In July 2018, the company was rebranded as AhroVista.

The company is one of the largest agricultural companies in Ukraine.

History
The company was founded in the village of Holovkivka. From 2008 to 2014, the holding owned the Football Club UkrAhroKom, and merged with FC Oleksandriya in 2014. Following the merger, the company became the title sponsor of FC Oleksandriya. Football (a.k.a. "soccer" in America) matches would be held for the professional football club as well as other local teams.

In 2015, UkrAhroKom secured a long-term loan from the Export–Import Bank of the United States to purchase modern elevator systems.

Infrastructure

 Svitlovodsk river terminal (grain elevator)
 Sharovka grain elevator
 UkrAhroKom grain elevator

Charity activity

The company has been the title sponsor for various sports clubs throughout Europe and finances all events held by these sports organizations.

See also
 FC UkrAhroKom Holovkivka

References 

Agriculture companies of Ukraine
Grain elevators
Economy of Kirovohrad Oblast
2000 establishments in Ukraine